Isaac Ferris (1798-1873) was the third President of New York University.

Ferris graduated from Columbia College in 1816. In 1820, he was appointed by the Board of Domestic Missions to labor in the Classis of Montgomery.
He served in the Second Church of Albany from 1824 to 1836 and was active in the Market Street Dutch Reform Church in New York City from 1836 to 1853. He served as Chancellor of New York University from 1853 to 1870. During his tenure he brought financial stability to the university.

Ferris was also a founder of the Rutgers Female College, a member of the American Bible Society, founder of the YMCA of Greater New York.

References

1798 births
1873 deaths
Presidents of New York University
Columbia College (New York) alumni
American clergy
19th-century American clergy